The Mitchel Range is a mountain range in San Bernardino County, California, United States.

References 

Mountain ranges of Southern California
Mountain ranges of San Bernardino County, California